The following is a list of Major League Baseball players, retired or active.

Kj through Kz

References

External links
List of Major League Baseball players at Baseball-Reference

 Kj-Kz